Municipal Museum Boijmans Van Beuningen is an art museum in Rotterdam in the Netherlands. The name of the museum is derived from the two most important collectors of Frans Jacob Otto Boijmans and Daniël George van Beuningen. It is located at the Museumpark in the district Rotterdam Centrum, close to the Kunsthal and the Natural History Museum.

The museum opened in 1849. It houses the collections of Frans Jacob Otto Boijmans (1767–1847) and Daniël George van Beuningen (1877–1955). The museum has become the house of over 151,000 artworks over 170 years. In the collection, ranging from medieval to contemporary art, are works of Rembrandt, Claude Monet, Vincent van Gogh, and Salvador Dalí and other famous collections that includes the masterpieces of the ‘Achilles series’ by Peter Paul Rubens and ‘A Cornfield, in the Background the Zuiderzee’ by Jacob van Ruisdael.

In 2013, the museum had 292,711 visitors and was the 14th most visited museum in the Netherlands.

The museum has been closed since 2019 due to improvement works and is scheduled to reopen in 2026.

History 
The museum was established in 1849 as Museum Boijmans with the collection of Frans Jacob Otto Boijmans (1767–1847). After the agreement between the Rotterdam City Council and Boijmans, the Schielandshuis was bought by City Council to house the collections. The painter and art dealer, Arie Johannes Lamme, was named the museum's first director. Much of the museum's original collection was destroyed in a fire in 1864. After the devastating fire breakout, the Schielandshuis became small to fit the growing collections and visitors of Museum Boijmans. Then the new museum was built in 1929 and opened in Museumpark in 1935. The building was designed by the city architect Adriaan van der Steur (1893-1953).

Then the exhibition building was built which was designed by the architect Alexander Bodon (1906-1993) with the purpose of exhibition. "In 2003 the Flemish architects Robbrecht en Daem added new galleries to the exhibition building, siting them like a girdle around Bodon's large rooms. In their galleries they used clear and frosted glass, concrete and parts of the original brick wall. This and the library on the street side are the most recent extensions of the museum until now."

The collection of businessman Daniël George van Beuningen (1877–1955) was added in 1958, at which point the museum acquired the name Museum Boymans–Van Beuningen. The spelling was changed to 'Museum Boijmans Van Beuningen' in 1996. A spokesman of the Dutch Jewish community, Ronny Naftaniel, demanded without success the removal of Van Beuningen's name because of his acquisitions of Jewish-owned artworks during the Holocaust in the Netherlands.  The Van Beuningen de Vriese Pavilion was built and designed by the Hubert-Jan Henket in 1991 to add the collections from the Beuningen.

Architecture 
The building of Van der Steur had been built with the consideration of detail lighting, spaces which were inspired by the surroundings. The architect used traditional materials such as brick, natural stone and copper.

The exhibition building was built with three large flexible spaces that could be reconfigured depending on each exhibitions needs. Bodon created a 'new wing' at a time when modern art literally and figuratively required space. The rooms had white and diffused lighting from above. The view of the garden from the large window gave views which reputedly distracted the attention of some visitors from the art.  The ceiling which showed the arts' character with details of design meaning in them.

The pavilion holds the collections of preindustrial household objects. The space of pavilion is very transparent as the building has used the glass and silver-colored steel roof construction.

The construction of Depot Museum Boijmans Van Beuningen was started in 2017 and was officially opened by king Willem-Alexander on November 5, 2021. It is the world's first fully accessible art depot. The depot has been built in consideration of public and private partnership where inside and outside are intertwined. The plan of the museum is to give the visitors an impression in great scale of the collections which can be seen from the central staircase and landings. The ground floor of the depot consists of a welcoming entrance area with coffee corner, also is used for art handlings. The upper floors are for exhibitions spaces. The atrium gallery which has glass roof has collections from old buildings. The building is built with the sustainability in mind by architects MVRDV. The depot facade is covered by different types of glass with different color code to make the building flexible with the natural lightings. For example, the roof is coded with pink glass, which are transparent to afford visitors a view of the city and museum from the roof. There is also the restaurant Renilde (named after the former curator Renilde Hammacher) and salon Coert (named after the former director of the Rotterdam Museum Coert Ebbinge Wubben) situated.

Collection

 

The museum has a diverse collection ranging from medieval to contemporary art, with somewhat of a focus on Dutch art. Much of the collection came to the museum through the two private collections mentioned above, but many others have contributed throughout the years. The museum also holds many great house hold objects which emphasize the history of design over the 8th centuries. The collection of the household objects contain from the medieval pitchers and glass from the Golden Age to the furniture by many prominent designers and with contemporary Dutch design.

Among the best-known artists that are exhibited in the permanent exhibition of the museum are Hieronymus Bosch, Pieter Bruegel the Elder, Rembrandt, Claude Monet, Wassily Kandinsky, Vincent van Gogh, Maurizio Cattelan, Paul Cézanne, René Magritte, Salvador Dalí, Mark Rothko, Edvard Munch, Willem de Kooning, and Yayoi Kusama.

The collection also includes one of the richest assembly of works on paper (etchings, drawings, lithographs, etc.) in the world from the Middle Ages to the present times.

Selected works
 The Glorification of the Virgin (c. 1490–95) by Geertgen tot Sint Jans
 The Wayfarer by Hieronymus Bosch
 Nest of Owls by Hieronymus Bosch
 The "Little" Tower of Babel by Pieter Bruegel the Elder
 Titus at his Desk (1655) by Rembrandt
 Belisarius receiving alms (1669) by Mattia Preti
 Hut of the Douaniers with Varengeville (1882) Claude Monet
 Portrait of Armand Roulin (1888) by Vincent van Gogh
 On the Threshold of Liberty (1929) by René Magritte
 Not to be Reproduced (1937) René Magritte
 Impressions of Africa (1938) Salvador Dalí
 Shirley Temple, The Youngest, Most Sacred Monster of the Cinema in Her Time (1939) Salvador Dalí
 The Face of War (1940) Salvador Dalí
The collections in the museum gives the brief description of history of design.

The Wrath of Achilles, (c. 1630- 1635) by Peter Paul Rubens, is a tapestry from Achilles series. The tapestries flourished hugely from the Gothic period and remained until today. These tapestries are the mirror image of the sketch but these are weaving techniques in which the design are carried out back to front. The tapestries were hung in the walls of prestigious reception rooms during these periods.

The Tulipcabinet, (c. 1635–1650) by Herman Doomer, is the cabinets built or used during Renaissance period where the use of decorative motifs were famous. The tulip motif in this cabinet indicates the symbol of wealth and the tulip bulb carries the symbol of enormous sums of money in the 17th century. This also indicates that this type of cabinets were used by noble rich peoples.

The Display rummer with panorama of the city and harbour of Hamburg,(in 1704–1709) by Johann Simon Rothaer, is a goblet or monumental wineglass which is engraved with cityscape of Hamburg using copper wheel engraving representing the 18th century and pre-industrial design. There are figures on the foot which represents the four seasons. These types of goblets were often used on the buffet during spectacular banquets.

The Mountainous evening landscape, (c.1665) by Adam Pijanacker, is the two dimensional painting which were widely used as a decorative effect for wall coverings and was fashionable thing to fill the walls with landscape paintings in Netherlands around 17th centuries.

The Mondial chair, (c. 1957–1958) by Wim Rietveld, is the design manufactured during industrial which been created with sheet metal structure and fibre-glass seat reinforced with plastic. It was designed in the collaboration between Gerrit Rietveld and his son Wim.  The chair gives remarkable simplicity with its special K profile of the back, the seat, the legs.

The Cupboard 'Carlton', (c. 1981) by Ettore Sottsass, is unique to the design practiced during 80s by Italian designers' group. This design was considered or called as anti-design as the designer had used liberal color with low cultural aspects. "Laminated prints of imitation marble and wood are used to decorate the surfaces of the furniture. One of the most used patterns is one taken from a blown-up image of bacteria. Sottsass once testified to having taken inspiration from tiles from subway bathrooms." Even though the materials used in this furniture were industrial, they were produced in limited series as this design was the protest of designers against the mass consumptions and corporate design style. This development made everyone to think the purpose and meaning of each objects in their surroundings in transition of modernism art deco designs.

Along with this type of design collections, Museum Boijmans Van Beuningen holds many objects from 1500 to the present day displaying a specific theme in the history of design. For example, the collections of  Oriental porcelain in the seventeenth and eighteenth centuries in the building. "The museum used seven rooms to exhibit some thirty themes from the history of design, illustrated by objects from the Middle Ages until now: from a 17th century tulip chest to an Eames chair, from ceramics from the middle ages to china by Hella Jongerius." These designs display us how almost everything was handmade which showed the craftsmanship before industrial period or before different technologies were invented. The collections in the museum shows the evolution of designs over the centuries to present day designs.

Nazi looted art 
Dirk Hannema, the director of the Boijmans from 1921 to 1945, acquired for the museum artworks that had been looted from Jewish collectors who were deported and murdered in the Holocaust during the German occupation of the Netherlands. Some of the looted artworks have been restituted to the families of the victims. In 2018 an exhibition was created around the history of the Boijman and Nazi looted art. The issue of artworks looted from Jews in the museum collection remains contentious and unresolved.

Activities 
The Education Department of the museum organizes children's activities, courses, lectures and tours.

ARTtube
ARTtube is a website with videos about art and design. ARTtube is produced by Museum Boijmans Van Beuningen, M HKA Antwerp, Gemeentemuseum Den Haag, Stedelijk Museum Amsterdam, De Pont, Centraal Museum Utrecht, Museum Jan Cunen and  Rotterdam.

Television
Museum Boijmans Van Beuningen produces, together with TV Rijnmond, a television series on art. Boijmans TV is based on an idea by Wilfried de Jong. Boijmans TV is created by a team of creative specialists in different disciplines. It is more than an art magazine; apart from the artists, the museum visitor, the attendant and the employee of technical services appear on the series.
Each episode of Boijmans TV can be viewed on  ArtTube after it has been broadcast.

Administration 
Sjarel Ex has been the museum director since 2004.

The museum had 292,711 visitors in 2013. That year it was the most visited museum in Rotterdam and the 14th most visited museum in the Netherlands.

It had an estimated 270,000 visitors in 2015.

See also 

 Dirk Hannema

Notes

References

External links

 
Virtual tour of the Museum Boijmans Van Beuningen provided by Google Arts & Culture

 
1849 establishments in the Netherlands
Art museums and galleries in the Netherlands
Former private collections
Modern art museums
Museums in Rotterdam
Museums established in 1849
Rijksmonuments in Rotterdam
Buildings and structures in Rotterdam
19th-century architecture in the Netherlands